November 2022 tornado outbreak may refer to:

Tornado outbreak of November 4–5, 2022
Tornado outbreak of November 29–30, 2022